Erbessa umbrifera is a moth of the family Notodontidae first described by Francis Walker in 1854. It is found in French Guiana, Guyana, Suriname and Brazil.

References

Moths described in 1854
Notodontidae of South America